Stem Cell Research is a peer-reviewed open access scientific journals of cell biology. The journal was established in 2007, and is currently published 8 times per year by Elsevier. The current editor-in-chief is Thomas Zwaka (Icahn School of Medicine at Mount Sinai).

Abstracting and indexing
The journal is abstracted and indexed in the following bibliographic databases:

According to the Journal Citation Reports, the journal has a 2020 impact factor of 2.02.

References

External links

Elsevier academic journals
Molecular and cellular biology journals
English-language journals
Publications established in 2007